Aleksandr Andreevich Vasilkin (born 17 June 1997) is a Russian badminton player.

Achievements

BWF International Challenge/Series (2 runners-up) 
Men's doubles

Mixed doubles

  BWF International Challenge tournament
  BWF International Series tournament
  BWF Future Series tournament

References

External links 
 
 Team Russia 2016

1997 births
Living people
Russian male badminton players